Andosilla is a town in the province and autonomous community of Navarra, northern Spain.

Demography 
From:INE Archiv

Twin towns
 Arnedo, Spain

References

External links
 ANDOSILLA in the Bernardo Estornés Lasa – Auñamendi Encyclopedia (Euskomedia Fundazioa) 

Municipalities in Navarre